Boyd Escarpment is a rock and snow escarpment which extends northeast for  from Wujek Ridge, in the Dufek Massif, Pensacola Mountains. It was named in 1979 by the Advisory Committee on Antarctic Names after Walter W. Boyd, Jr., a U.S. International Geophysical Year glaciologist who wintered at Little America, 1957; geologist, United States Geological Survey, for three summers in the Pensacola Mountains, 1962–66.

Features
Geographical features include:

 Bennett Spur
 Cox Nunatak
 Rankine Rock

References 

Escarpments of Queen Elizabeth Land